Raymond Gentle-City Boys United is a Belizean football team which currently competes in the Premier League of Belize.

The team is based in Belize City.  Their home stadium is MCC Grounds.

References

Football clubs in Belize